Breezy Point is a city in Crow Wing County, Minnesota, United States. It is part of the Brainerd Micropolitan Statistical Area. The population was 2,346 at the 2010 census.

History
The city of Breezy Point is best known for being the home to a resort of the same name on land acquired in 1921 by millionaire publicist Wilford Fawcett, owner of Fawcett Publications, and creator of the famous Whiz Bang magazine. His personal home, Fawcett House, is on rental to the public.

With the resort community growing as a result of Fawcett's actions, a village was incorporated in 1939 with the name of Pelican Lakes.  It was renamed to Breezy Point in 1969.

Geography
Main routes include County Roads 4, 11, and 39.

Breezy Point is part of the Brainerd Lakes Area. It is along Pelican Lake.

Demographics

2010 census
As of the census of 2010, there were 2,346 people, 904 households, and 681 families living in the city. The racial makeup of the city was 98.7% White, 0.3% African American, 0.3% Native American, 0.2% Asian, 0.1% from other races, and 0.6% from two or more races. Hispanic or Latino of any race were 0.3% of the population.

There were 904 households, of which 37.2% had children under the age of 18 living with them, 65.5% were married couples living together, 6.2% had a female householder with no spouse present, 3.7% had a male householder with no spouse present, and 24.7% were non-families. 19.9% of all households were made up of individuals, and 5.7% had someone living alone who was 65 years of age or older. The average household size was 2.60 and the average family size was 2.97.

The median age in the city was 38.4 years. 27.9% of residents were under the age of 18; 4.2% were between the ages of 18 and 24; 28.4% were from 25 to 44; 26.1% were from 45 to 64; and 13.5% were 65 years of age or older. The gender makeup of the city was 50.7% male and 49.3% female.

2000 census
As of the census of 2000, there were 979 people, 413 households, and 306 families living in the city. The racial makeup of the city was 98.16% White, 0.20% African American, 0.31% Native American, 0.10% Asian, 0.20% from other races, and 1.02% from two or more races. Hispanic or Latino of any race were 0.31% of the population. 35.7% were of German, 16.2% Norwegian, 8.3% Swedish, 6.7% Polish, 6.6% Irish and 5.2% English ancestry according to Census 2000.

There were 413 households, out of which 28.1% had children under the age of 18 living with them, 66.3% were married couples living together, 4.8% had a female householder with no husband present, and 25.7% were non-families. 19.9% of all households were made up of individuals, and 5.8% had someone living alone who was 65 years of age or older.  The average household size was 2.37 and the average family size was 2.69.

In the city, the population was spread out, with 21.9% under the age of 18, 5.3% from 18 to 24, 24.2% from 25 to 44, 29.2% from 45 to 64, and 19.4% who were 65 years of age or older.  The median age was 43 years. For every 100 females, there were 95.8 males.  For every 100 females age 18 and over, there were 102.4 males.

The median income for a household in the city was $84,000, and the median income for a family was $99,063. Males had a median income of $88,125 versus $51,397 for females. The per capita income for the city was $81,959.  About 0.9% of families and 2.2% of the population were below the poverty line, including 2.9% of those under age 18 and 2.9% of those age 65 or over.

Education
Pequot Lakes Public Schools is the public school district. Pequot Lakes High School is the district's high school.

References

External links
Breezy Point, MN – City Website

Cities in Minnesota
Cities in Crow Wing County, Minnesota
Brainerd, Minnesota micropolitan area
1939 establishments in Minnesota